Statistics of the Scottish Football League in season 1925–26.

Scottish League Division One

Scottish League Division Two

Scottish League Division Three

See also
1925–26 in Scottish football

References

 
Scottish Football League seasons